The Albert Schweitzer Fellowship is a non-profit organization in the United States, that was established in 1940 as one of the many fellowships created in developed countries to support the work of Albert Schweitzer at the Hôpital Albert Schweitzer in present-day Gabon; these fellowships were coordinated by the Association Internationale de l'oeuvre du docteur Albert Schweitzer de Lambaréné (AISL), which also oversaw the hospital.  It subsequently expanded its focus to supporting Schweitzer Fellows, primarily graduate students, as they partner with community-based organizations to develop and implement year-long, mentored service projects that meet the health needs of underserved populations.

There are 250 Schweitzer Fellows selected annually across 13 U.S. cities and the Albert Schweitzer Hospital. Each fellow is responsible for personally volunteering hundreds of hours of service. The alumni group of fellows is known as the Schweitzer Fellows for Life.

The Fellowship's central office is hosted at Beth Israel Deaconess Medical Center, the official sister hospital of the Albert Schweitzer Hospital.

The Fellowship also administers the Albert Schweitzer Prize for Humanitarianism on behalf of Schweitzer Fellows for Life. Recent recipients include former U.S. Surgeon General David Satcher (2009) and community health center founder H. Jack Geiger.

References 

Charities based in Massachusetts
Non-profit organizations based in Boston
1940 establishments in the United States
Health charities in the United States
Medical and health organizations based in Massachusetts